Deli Mike or Deli Mayk (English: Crazy Mike) is a nickname given to an Airbus A340-300 operated by Turkish Airlines with civil registration TC-JDM. The aircraft joined the Turkish Airlines fleet in 1996 to replace the McDonnell Douglas DC-10s of the airline and was used to operate long-haul flights out of Turkey. During its operation, Deli Mike had a record of having minor and strange technical failures. This unreliability gave the aircraft its nickname, which is a wordplay on the ICAO spelling alphabet.

In its late use, the aircraft operated both long-haul and short-haul flights. It was re-configured in 2016 to only have economy class seats and was solely used to carry pilgrims to Hajj. Deli Mike was removed from the Turkish Airlines fleet in early 2019 and was flown to O. R. Tambo International Airport later that year and re-registered as 2-AVRA. The aircraft was stored at Johannesburg for almost 4 years. In December 2022, it was flown to Mehrabad International Airport.

History

Background 

In the late 1980s, Turkish Airlines wanted to expand to North America and East Asia. The McDonnell Douglas DC-10s operated by the airline during that time were in the process of being phased out, leaving the Airbus A310 as the only option for these routes. However, the Airbus A310 did not have the range to fly to these destinations and would have had to make a stopover to refuel. In January 1990, after examining two possible aircraft types—the Airbus A340 and McDonnell Douglas MD-11—an internal commission unanimously voted to opt for the Airbus A340 due to its technical advantages and cost benefits. On 27 March 1990, Turkish Airlines ordered five Airbus A340-300 aircraft, which included an option for a further five. TC-JDM joined the fleet of Turkish Airlines in April 1996 and became the fourth A340 to do so. The aircraft was given the name "İzmir".

Technical failures and nickname 

Shortly after delivery, the aircraft started to have "random" technical issues and failures. Sometimes, the aircraft would turn its external lights on by itself and then back off when someone tried to intervene. Occasionally, the lights of the emergency exits would turn on one by one from front to back "like a Mexican wave", not all at the same time, which according to the cabin crew meant that Deli Mike "was in a good mood". The aircraft also made "small jokes" to passengers and crew. On one occasion, the aircraft started sounding the master caution alarm in the cockpit, causing one of the inexperienced cabin crew members to panic. Frequent problems with the aircraft included the reading light of a completely different passenger turning on when the button is pressed, and the same issue also exists with the button used to call a crew member. One popular story among technical staff states that an employee fixed the faulty flight instruments of the aircraft simply by talking to it.

In the ICAO spelling alphabet used in aviation, the spelling of D and M, the final two letters of the civil registration of the aircraft, is "Delta Mike". Following the technical problems surrounding the aircraft, technicians of Turkish Airlines have swapped "Delta" to "Deli"—meaning "crazy" in Turkish—to reflect the characteristics of the aircraft, which resulted in the nickname "Deli Mike".

Subsequent history 

Despite their age, Airbus A340's were used as "jokers" in the 2010s, flying both short domestic and long-haul flights. In September 2011, Deli Mike had a runway excursion while landing at Chhatrapati Shivaji Maharaj International Airport in Mumbai. None of the occupants were injured in the incident. Turkish Airlines pulled its Airbus A340 aircraft from scheduled flights in May 2016. From July 2016 onwards, TC-JDM and other A340 aircraft in the Turkish Airlines fleet were used on charter flights to carry passengers to Hajj. The aircraft was reconfigured to have an all-economy class layout, without any business class seats. During the winter period of 2016, a heavy downfall in traffic caused the airline to temporarily ground dozens of aircraft, including Deli Mike. In August 2017, Hürriyet reported that Turkish Airlines expected to maintain its Airbus A340 aircraft and use them for the Hajj flights until 2021 "thanks to good maintenance". Deli Mike was the oldest aircraft of the Turkish Airlines fleet as of September 2017.

On 22 October 2018, Turkish Airlines grounded TC-JDM alongside her sister aircraft TC-JDN at Istanbul Atatürk Airport. The aircraft was retired from the fleet in early January 2019; the livery of the airline was removed from the aircraft later that month. There was initial speculation about the plane being turned into a restaurant, as had previously happened to three sister aircraft. In March 2019, the aircraft was ferried to O. R. Tambo International Airport in Johannesburg, South Africa. Subsequently, the aircraft was transferred to Avro Global, re-registered as 2-AVRA, and stored in Johannesburg.

In December 2022, Deli Mike and three other former Turkish Airlines Airbus A340's flew again for the first time in years. The planes departed Johannesburg back to back on 24 December towards Uzbekistan, but made an emergency landing at Mehrabad International Airport in Tehran, reportedly to evade sanctions placed on Iran.

Responses 

According to technicians of Turkish Technic, the aircraft maintenance subsidiary of Turkish Airlines, "Deli Mike can fly to the other side of the world without any problems if she wants to. If she doesn't feel like it, she won't move even one metre on the ground." The technicians also removed and reinstalled all systems on-board and reset the software of the aircraft in an attempt to solve the issues, without any success.

While criticizing Turkish Airlines in February 2018 for ordering new aircraft while many others were grounded in the meantime, Bora Erdin of pro-opposition newspaper Sözcü also added that the airline made "no clarification as to why the problematic plane [Deli Mike] was used persistently while unproblematic ones were on the ground" and highlighted the frequent issue of the landing gear not retracting after takeoff, causing the aircraft to return to the origin airport.

References

Notes

Bibliography

External links 
 
 TC-JDM in Planespotters.net

Airbus A340
Individual aircraft
Turkish Airlines